The Mornington Railway is a heritage railway near Mornington, a town on the Mornington Peninsula, near Melbourne, Victoria.  The line is managed by the Mornington Railway Preservation Society and operates on part of the former Victorian Railways branch line which ran from Baxter to Mornington.

History 
The Mornington railway line was a rural railway branching from the Stony Point railway line at Baxter. The line operated for 92 years before closing. Ten years later, the line was reopened as a heritage railway.
1888—In August the contract for building the line was given to David Munro for £25,000. A short branch line was built to Moorooduc quarry to transport stone for ballasting the line.
1889—Baxter to Mornington railway line opened on 10 September.
1981—The line was closed.
1984—The Mornington Railway Preservation Society (MRPS) was formed.
1988—Locomotive K163, restored and began running on the mainline network.
1991—The MRPS negotiated the lease of the Mornington Line from the junction at Baxter to Nepean Highway level crossing, Mornington.
1999—The line was reopened as a heritage railway from Moorooduc to Mornington.
2014—The Mornington railway celebrated 30 years of operation and 125 years of the Mornington line
2015—The Mornington railway received W241 from 707 Operations and 7CV from Seymour Railway Heritage Centre (SRHC). 59RM was sent to DERMPAV for eventual restoration
2017— The group obtained Melville for the SRHC, and was transferred from Newport Workshops to Moorooduc Yard in 2019.
2020— On 13 February, K163 was transferred from Moorooduc to Steamrail Victoria for maintenance work. In March, 34BE was transferred from the former South Gippsland Tourist Railway to Moorooduc, for eventual restoration.
2021— The former city-bound station building from Cheltenham station, arrived at railway to be rebuilt at Moorooduc Station

Mornington Railway Preservation Society
The Mornington Railway Preservation Society (MRPS) was formed out of a public meeting in 1984, with the objective of securing access to the then-closed Mornington railway line. The vision was to reopen it as a heritage railway, focusing on the operation of steam-hauled passenger trains. In 1991, the MRPS was granted a State Government Order in Council, giving access and operating rights to the line, so it could be operated as a heritage railway.

Prior to the granting of the Order in Council to the MRPS, the final section of the line between Rail Motor Stopping Place (RMSP) 16 and the former Mornington terminus, which was considered to have significant commercial value, was sold to private investors by the State Government. The track and infrastructure at the station was removed and some parcels of the land were subsequently developed, including an extension to the Mornington Bush Nursing Hospital and a new shopping complex erected on the site of the former Mornington station itself. A commemorative plaque and replica station name board, erected by Mornington Historical Society adjacent to the shopping centre, is now the only visible evidence of the original terminus.

The  turntable from Mornington Station was removed by SteamRail Victoria, which had been the custodians of it by arrangement with the State Government up until the time the site was sold. The turntable was later overhauled by SteamRail and re-installed at Warrnambool, where it is still in use, being required there to enable R class steam locomotives to be turned at that location. SteamRail offered the MRPS a  turntable, formerly at Yea, as a substitute, which is suitable for turning K, J, D3 and Y class locomotives. They are the only steam locomotive classes considered likely to operate on the line in the foreseeable future.

The station building at Mornington was made available to the MRPS for re-use, but was found to be infested with termites and largely unusable. The MRPS was able to recover most of the points, and some track, from the station yard. They will eventually be used to provide additional sidings at Moorooduc station, the main operating centre of the railway. Two palm trees, which graced the garden in front of the original station building for many years, were relocated to the new station site, but did not survive the transplanting in their new location.

At present, the heritage railway runs between Moorooduc station and the new Mornington station, which is sited at Yuilles Road in Mornington, 100m from the site of RMSP 16. The new station was opened formally on Sunday 18 April 1999, as a platform requiring pull-push working.  A run-around loop was added later.  There is an intermediate stop at Tanti Park station. There are plans for the remaining section of line, between Moorooduc station and Baxter station, to be restored.  The Peninsula Link freeway has been constructed with an overpass across the line to allow for continued operation, and might even assist future operations to Baxter by removing significant traffic from the Moorooduc Highway level crossing.

Operations
The MRPS is in possession of four former Victorian Railways K class steam locomotives, K 163 (formerly plinthed in Frankston), K 177 (donated by Langi Morgala Museum in Ararat), K 159 (formerly plinthed in Hamilton) and K 191 (formerly plinthed in Wangaratta). K 163 is the only one currently in service. K 177 is under heavy restoration, and K 191 has been disassembled for inspection and long term restoration.) The MRPS also has two T class diesel locomotives (T334 and T411) and a Victoria Railways rail tractor.

Tourist trains run on each Sunday of each month and on Wednesdays during Victorian school holidays, between Moorooduc and Mornington railway stations, although the current Mornington station is displaced somewhat due to the original alignment having been built over.

Steam locomotives

Diesel Locomotives

Passenger Carriages

Vans

See also
 Tourist and Heritage Railways Act

References

External links
 Mornington Railway

Tourist railways in Victoria (Australia)
Heritage railways in Australia
5 ft 3 in gauge railways in Australia
1889 establishments in Australia
1981 disestablishments in Australia
1991 establishments in Australia
Transport in the Shire of Mornington Peninsula